Bahay na Pula (lit. Red House) is a 2022 Filipino horror film directed by Brillante Mendoza, starring Julia Barreto, Xian Lim and Marco Gumabao.

Synopsis
Jane (Julia Barreto) travels with her husband Marco (Xian Lim) to go to Pola, Oriental Mindoro to seek the mayor's approval to demolish Jane's ancestral house. The caretaker gives them a tour of the home and Jane feels that something's amiss when they reach the basement.

The next day, Jane is informed that the buyer has backed out due to the local council's plans to designate the home as a national historical site. In her plan to reverse the decision, she meets her ex-lover, Anton (Marco Gumabao), who works as an assistant to the mayor. A series of events occur in the house - one event makes Jane's belly become bigger and bigger as if she is pregnant.

Cast 
 Julia Barreto as Jane 
 Xian Lim as Marco 
 Marco Gumabao as Anton

Release  
A teaser trailer was released on January 27, 2022.  The film was released worldwide on streaming service Vivamax on February 25, 2022.

References

2022 horror films
Films directed by Brillante Mendoza